Burua is a rural locality in the Gladstone Region, Queensland, Australia. In the  Burua had a population of 774 people.

History 
Clyde Creek Provisional School opened on 16 October 1882. On 1 January 1909 it became Clyde Creek State School. In 1911 it was renamed Burua State School. It closed on 1925.

Cockeye Scrub Provisional School opened on 16 February 1925, being renamed Burua West Provisional School on 6 Mar 1925, and then Theresa Provisional School on 8 September 1927. On 1 April 1931 it became Theresa State School. It closed permanently on 31 December 1940.

Faith Baptist Christian School opened on 1998.

In the  Burua had a population of 774 people.

Geography
The Calliope River forms the western boundary.

Road infrastructure
The Bruce Highway passes through the south-west corner, and the Dawson Highway runs through from north to south.

Education 
Faith Baptist Christian School is a private primary and secondary (Prep-12) school for boys and girls at 1315 Dawson Highway. In 2018, the school had an enrolment of 69 students with 7 teachers and 14 non-teaching staff (10 full-time equivalent).

References 

Gladstone Region
Localities in Queensland